The 1966 KFK competitions in Ukraine were part of the 1966 Soviet KFK competitions that were conducted in the Soviet Union. It was 3rd season of the KFK in Ukraine since its introduction in 1964.

First stage

Group 1

Group 2

Group 3

Group 4

Notes:
 The goal difference in the table is not balanced.
 Aviator Kirovohrad replaced last season Spartak Kirovohrad

Group 5

Notes:
 Last season Avanhard Kryukiv played as Avanhard Kremenchuk

Group 6

Final
Final stage was taking place on 29 October – 4 November 1966 in city of Buchach.

Promotion
None of KFK teams were promoted to the 1967 Ukrainian Class B.
 None

However, to the Class B were promoted following teams that did not participate in the KFK competitions:
 FC Stal Dnipropetrovsk
 FC Sitall Kostiantynivka

References

Ukrainian Football Amateur League seasons
KFK